The Battle of Kanagawa took place during the Sengoku period (16th century) of Japanese history, between Oda and Hōjō forces.

History 
Following the sudden death of Oda Nobunaga, the Hōjō family soon took  advantage of the situation and launched an attack on Oda clan territory. 

Hojo Ujimasa's forces led by  Ujinao and Ujikuni attack Oda Nobunaga's senior retainer, Takigawa Kazumasu, who had received territories after the defeat of Takeda Katsuyori the same year in 1582. 

On the border between the Kōzuke and Musashi provinces, Kazumasu faced off against the Hōjō forces at Kanegawa. Kazumasu had 18,000 troops, while the Hōjō wielded 55,000, Kazumasu's defeat and retreated to Nagashima.

References

1582 in Japan
Kanagawa
Kanagawa